Central Jersey Spartans was an American soccer team based in Lawrenceville, New Jersey, United States. Founded in 2009, the team played in the USL Premier Development League (PDL), the fourth tier of the American Soccer Pyramid, in the Mid Atlantic Division of the Eastern Conference.

The team played its home games at Falcon Field in nearby Hillsborough, New Jersey, where they have played since 2011. The team's colors were blue, white and gold.

History
The Central Jersey Spartans were announced as PDL expansion team in November 2009. They played their first official game on May 12, 2010, a 2–0 loss to Newark Ironbound Express.

Players

Notable former players
This list of notable former players comprises players who went on to play professional soccer after playing for the team in the Premier Development League, or those who previously played professionally before joining the team.

   R. J. Allen
  José Angulo
  Nelson Becerra
  Scott Caldwell
  Marc Cintron
  Greg Cochrane
  Ryan Finley
  Antoine Hoppenot
  Ryan Kinne
  Bryan Meredith
  Jon Okafor
  Teddy Schneider
  Mark Wiltse

Year-by-year

Head coaches
  Sam Nellins (2010–2012)
  John Newman (2012–2013)
  James Quinn (2013–present)

Stadia
 Stadium at Rider University; Lawrenceville, New Jersey (2010–2011)
 Stadium at The College of New Jersey; Ewing Township, New Jersey 2 games (2010)
 PDA Complex; Zarephath, New Jersey 1 game (2010)
 Falcon Field; Hillsborough, New Jersey (2011–2013)

Average attendance
Attendance stats are calculated by averaging each team's self-reported home attendances from the historical match archive at https://web.archive.org/web/20100105175057/http://www.uslsoccer.com/history/index_E.html.

 2010: 100

References

External links
Official Site
Official PDL site

Association football clubs established in 2009
Defunct Premier Development League teams
Soccer clubs in New Jersey
2009 establishments in New Jersey
Association football clubs disestablished in 2013
2013 disestablishments in New Jersey